Maria V. Mavroudi (born 1967) is a Greek-born American historian, linguist, and educator. She is a history professor at University of California, Berkeley.

Education
Mavroudi graduated from Anatolia College in Thessaloniki, Greece; from the University of Thessaloniki with a Philology degree; and from Harvard University with a PhD in 1998 Byzantine Studies. Her doctoral advisor was Ihor Ševčenko.

Career 
She researches the recycling of the ancient tradition between Byzantium and Islam; Byzantine intellectual history; survival and transformation of Byzantine culture after 1453, along with other various topics.

Fluent in classical Greek and Arabic, she also understands Coptic, Latin, and Syriac, and speaks modern Greek and English fluently. She formerly taught at Princeton University.

Awards
 2004, MacArthur Fellowship

Works

The occult sciences in Byzantium, Editors Paul Magdalino, Maria V. Mavroudi, La Pomme d'or, 2006, 
the "Oneirocriticon of Achmet" and its Arabic sources, Brill, 2002, 
[https://books.google.com/books?id=tyLr097z_LYC&dq=Maria+Mavroudi&pg=PA105 "Theodore Hyrtakenos''' Description of the Garden of St. Anna and the Ekphrasis of Gardens"], Byzantine garden culture, Editors Antony Robert Littlewood, Henry Maguire, Joachim Wolschke-Bulmahn, Dumbarton Oaks, 2002, 

References

 External links 
 UC Berkeley Faculty Page
 "Byzantium: Beyond the Cliché - A Conversation with Maria Mavroudi", Ideas Roadshow'', 2014

Living people
MacArthur Fellows
Greek emigrants to the United States
Aristotle University of Thessaloniki alumni
Harvard University alumni
Princeton University faculty
University of California, Berkeley faculty
1967 births
American philologists
Women philologists
21st-century American historians
American women historians
21st-century American women
Historians from California